Tim Sluiter (born 17 May 1989) is a Dutch professional golfer.

Sluiter was born in Enschede. After showing promise as an amateur, including winning the French Amateur, Sluiter took a golf scholarship to the University of Southern California in the United States. He won two intercollegiate tournaments, but chose to drop out of college after two years in order to turn professional. In his debut full professional season in 2010, Sluiter won twice on the third-tier EPD Tour, and then came through qualifying school to secure a place on the European Tour in 2011.

Amateur wins
2006 Dutch National U21 Championship, RiverWoods Dutch Junior Open, Dutch National Strokeplay Championship
2007 French Amateur
2008 USC Collegiate Invitational
2009 CordeValle Collegiate

Professional wins (3)

EPD Tour wins (2)

Hi5 Pro Tour wins (1)

Playoff record
Challenge Tour playoff record (0–1)

Team appearances
Amateur
European Boys' Team Championship (representing the Netherlands): 2005, 2007
Jacques Léglise Trophy (representing the Continent of Europe): 2005 (winners), 2006 (winners)
European Youths' Team Championship (representing the Netherlands): 2006
Eisenhower Trophy (representing the Netherlands): 2006 (winners)
European Amateur Team Championship (representing the Netherlands): 2007, 2008, 2009
Palmer Cup (representing Europe): 2008 (winners), 2009 (winners)
St Andrews Trophy (representing the Continent of Europe): 2008
Source:

Professional
World Cup (representing the Netherlands): 2013

See also
2010 European Tour Qualifying School graduates
2011 European Tour Qualifying School graduates

References

External links

Dutch male golfers
USC Trojans men's golfers
European Tour golfers
Sportspeople from Enschede
1989 births
Living people
21st-century Dutch people